Derry City and Strabane District Council (Ulster-Scots: Derry Cittie & Stràbane Destrìck Cooncil) is the local authority for Derry and Strabane district in Northern Ireland. It was created as part of the 2014 Northern Ireland local government reform, replacing Derry City Council and Strabane District Council. The first elections to the authority were on 22 May 2014 and it acted as a shadow authority to its two predecessors until the new district formally came into being on 1 April 2015. The name was changed from Derry and Strabane City Council on 24 February 2016.

Mayoralty

Mayor

Deputy Mayor

Councillors
For the purpose of elections the council is divided into seven district electoral areas (DEAs):

Party strengths

Councillors by electoral area

† Co-opted to fill a vacancy since the election.‡ Changed party affiliation since the election.Last updated 20 December 2022.

For further details see 2019 Derry and Strabane District Council election.

Population
The area covered by the new council has a population of 147,720 residents according to the 2011 UK census.

See also 
 Local government in Northern Ireland
 2014 Northern Ireland local elections
 Political make-up of local councils in the United Kingdom

References

External links 
 Your Councillors - Derry and Strabane District Council

 
District councils of Northern Ireland
Politics of County Londonderry
Politics of County Tyrone